TVP3 Gdańsk is one of the regional branches of the TVP, Poland's public television broadcaster. It serves the entire Pomeranian Voivodeship. There was (1990 - 2010) an informative television programme Rodnô Zemia in the Kashubian language.

External links 
 

Television channels and stations established in 1959
Mass media in Gdańsk
Telewizja Polska
Companies based in Gdańsk